Doris Schweizer (born 28 August 1989) is a Swiss racing cyclist, who most recently rode for UCI Women's Continental Team . She was the winner of the Swiss National Road Race Championships in 2013 and 2016 and the Swiss National Time Trial Championships in 2015 and 2016.

In November 2015 she was announced as part of the inaugural squad for the  team for the 2016 season.

Major results
Source: 

2007
 10th Time trial, UEC European Junior Road Championships
2010
 3rd Road race, National Road Championships
 8th Time trial, UEC European Under-23 Road Championships
2011
 4th Time trial, UEC European Under-23 Road Championships
 10th Road race, Summer Universiade
2012
 8th Memorial Davide Fardelli
2013
 National Road Championships
1st  Road race
2nd Time trial
 10th Overall Vuelta a El Salvador
1st Stage 2 (TTT)
2014
 3 Jours d'Aigle
1st Points race
2nd Individual pursuit
 National Road Championships
2nd Time trial
3rd Road race
 3rd  Team time trial, UCI Road World Championships
 3rd Overall Tour de Bretagne Féminin
1st Stage 1
 5th Overall Vuelta a El Salvador
 5th Grand Prix de Oriente
 5th Grand Prix el Salvador
 7th Overall Tour Cycliste Féminin International de l'Ardèche
 7th GP du Canton d'Argovie
 9th Overall Vuelta Internacional Femenina a Costa Rica
 9th Grand Prix GSB
2015
 National Road Championships
1st  Time trial
3rd Road race
 8th Overall Gracia–Orlová
 10th 94.7 Cycle Challenge
2016
 National Road Championships
1st  Road race
1st  Time trial
 1st Stage 7 Tour Cycliste Féminin International de l'Ardèche
 10th Overall Emakumeen Euskal Bira
1st Mountains classification

See also
 2014 Astana BePink Womens Team season

References

External links
 

1989 births
Living people
Swiss female cyclists
Sportspeople from Lucerne
21st-century Swiss women